Albany Mall is an enclosed shopping mall in Albany, Georgia. Opened in 1976, it features Belk, JCPenney, Dillard's, Old Navy, and Books-A-Million as its anchor stores. It is managed by Spinoso Real Estate Group.

History
The mall opened on August 4, 1976, originally featuring Gayfers (now Dillard's), Belk, Rosenberg's, and Sears as its anchor stores. Aronov Realty received approval in 1987 for a new wing featuring a new anchor store, JCPenney. This store replaced a nearby location at Midtown Shopping Center. The store opened in 1988. Also that year, the Belk store was renovated. Rosenberg's closed in 1990 and became Mansour's a year later.

Old Navy joined the mall in 2000, and Mansour's closed a year later. In April 2004, Books-A-Million relocated into the former Mansour's space, replacing a nearby store on Old Dawson Road. JCPenney was renovated in 2011. Sears closed in 2017. The former Sears anchor store was demolished in 2021.

References

External links
Albany Mall
MallSeeker.com

Shopping malls in Georgia (U.S. state)
Shopping malls established in 1976
Buildings and structures in Albany, Georgia
Tourist attractions in Albany, Georgia